The seventh season of the American reality television competition series HGTV Design Star premiered on May 29, 2012. The host and mentor this season is David Bromstad. Danielle Colding is the winner of Season 7 of Design Star. Her show Shop This Room premieres on August 4.

Designers

1 Age at the time of the show's filming

Elimination table

 (WINNER) The designer won the competition.
 (RUNNER-UP) The designer received second place.
 (WIN) The designer was selected as the winner of the episode's elimination challenge.
 (HIGH) The designer was selected as one of the top entries in the elimination challenge, but did not win.
 (IN) The designer advanced to the next challenge, but was not selected as a top nor a bottom entry in the elimination challenge.
 (LOW) The designer was selected as one of the bottom entries in the elimination challenge, but was not the final contestant to move on to the next round
 (LOW) The designer was selected as one of the bottom entries in the elimination challenge and was the final contestant to move on to the next round.
 (OUT) The designer was eliminated from the competition.

Challenges

Challenge 1: Home Sweet Hollywood
Designers get into six teams of two and three days to design a great room, three bedrooms, a den, and a design studio and lounge.
First Aired: May 29, 2012
Guest Judge: Daisy Fuentes

Challenge 2: White Room Challenge
First Aired: June 5, 2012
Guest Judge: Vanilla Ice

Challenge 3: Klassically Kardashian Design
First Aired: June 12, 2012
Guest Judge/Client: Kris Kardashian Jenner

Challenge 4: Designers Transform Indoor/Outdoor Spaces
First Aired: June 19, 2012
Guest Judge: Sabrina Soto

Challenge 5: Designers Celebrate Hollywood's 125th Birthday
The remaining seven designers must create small lounge areas for a party thrown by the Hollywood Chamber of Commerce. Each lounge must be inspired by a different time/design period seen in the history of Hollywood. For their Camera Challenge, the contestants must speak publicly to the event's guests about their space. 
First Aired: June 26, 2012
Guest Judge: Marg Helgenberger

Challenge 6: Dream Kitchens
First Aired: July 3, 2012
Guest Judges: The Kitchen Cousins

Challenge 7: Final Four Designers Make Over Condos
Designers randomly select different color hues and work on different condominiums and appear on National Daytime Show, The Talk.
First Aired: July 10, 2012
Guest Judge: Meg Caswell

Challenge 8: Yurt Last Chance
In order to move on to the final challenge, the final three designers must create a fantasy bedroom suite in a yurt, a unique and challenging structure to design in. They each get to work with a celebrity carpenter who is a current member of a television show. The designers must also film two camera challenges: one to display interaction with their respective carpenter and explain a project he is working on, and a second, more general one about the space. 
First Aired: July 17, 2012
Guest Judge: Mark Steines

Challenge 9: And The Winner Is.... 
For the last challenge, the final two designers have to make pilots for their own show. Before they begin, the last four designers to be eliminated returned and split into two teams. One going with Brittany and the other going with Danielle alongside their carpenters. Mikel and Rachel joined Brittany and Hilari and Stanley joined Danielle.  Each team had a real family to transform a dining and living room for.
First Aired: July 24, 2012
Guest Judge: David Bromstad

Fan Favorite Voting Results
From May 1, 2012 until July 27, 2012, fans of the show could go to HGTV Design Star's website and vote ten times each day for their favorite designers to win an online show. On July 27, runner-up Britany Simon was announced as the winner of the fan favorite contest. Her online show will premiere soon.

References

2012 American television seasons